Potong Pasir is a housing estate located between Toa Payoh and Sennett Estate in the Central Region of Singapore. For urban planning purposes, it is classified under the Toa Payoh area.

Politically, Potong Pasir had been the longest-held opposition ward in one-party dominant Singapore. Its Opposition Member of Parliament Chiam See Tong held the ward from 1984 to 2011. In 2011, the ward, led by Mrs. Lina Chiam, was lost to 3-time challenger Sitoh Yih Pin in what was the slimmest of margins of 114 votes, with 242 votes rejected. Mr. Chiam See Tong led a team of 5 to contest in the Bishan-Toa Payoh Group Representation Constituency (GRC) during that General Elections.

Potong Pasir is accessible by the MRT station on the North East line.

The Potong Pasir Community Club in Potong Pasir hosts facilities such as a multi-purpose hall, activity rooms as well as a KFC outlet. The multi-purpose hall can be used as a badminton court and serves the residents of the state.

There are private houses and condominiums located within the neighbourhood, in Sennett Estate.

History
From 1910 to 1937, it was dominated by sand-quarries, hence giving it its present name, which means 'cut sand' in Malay. These mining activities created four ponds linked to the Kallang River, although they were reduced to two due to massive flooding in 1968. The ponds provided a good source of food for the local village folk, until pollution set in later.

In the mid 1950s, Potong Pasir was one of the most important vegetable growing areas in Singapore. The land here had been cultivated since the 1830s. The farmers there were almost all Cantonese and they used traditional methods with great success.

Leafy vegetables were grown on farms located in lowland areas such as Potong Pasir, Changi, Ponggol, and Sembawang. Watercress was the most important type of vegetable grown in Potong Pasir. A small portion of farmland was used for planting coconut palms.

Vegetable farming in Singapore was a family business. Farmers of Potong Pasir lived in attap houses, in zinc roof and semi-concrete houses. The general condition of the rural roads was poor. Most farmers in the area leased their land from the Government.

During the early years, Potong Pasir was also a site of regular flooding. Villagers would take refuge in nearby St Andrew's School, which was on Woodsville Hill.

Rapid change took place for the past five decades, with the building of a bridge across the ponds in the 1950s, a venue for education introduced in the form of a village community centre in 1952, piped water and electricity in the 1960s, and by the 1970s, most of the villagers had already started to move out as the land was acquired by the government for massive redevelopment.

Hence, a public housing estate, Potong Pasir Estate, began to take shape in the 1980s, with construction commencing in 1982, and the first blocks completed two years later. The sloping roof of some blocks became the most recognisable icon of Potong Pasir. From then till now, the ward has managed to retain its idyllic feel even as the pace of urbanisation has caught up with other areas.

Historically, a road called "Jalan Potong Pasir" used to cut through the area. This historic road has since ceased to exist, but it defined the lines of the Potong Pasir Single Member Constituency as it started the current Lorong 8 Toa Payoh at Braddell Road and ending at Potong Pasir Avenue 1 at Upper Serangoon Road.

Political history

Potong Pasir is currently managed by Sitoh Yih Pin of the People's Action Party as of the recent 2020 General Elections. Before the 2011 General Elections, Singapore's then-longest serving opposition Member of Parliament (MP) and Secretary-General of the Singapore People's Party (SPP) (previously Singapore Democratic Party (SDP) until 1994, and part of Singapore Democratic Alliance (SDA) between 2001 and 2010), Chiam See Tong, served this constituency from 1984 to 2011.

Elections in Potong Pasir have always been intensely contested as the ruling People's Action Party attempted to win the constituency. The current People's Action Party candidate, Sitoh Yih Pin (who made his debut in 2001), has much support from the party, despite the last candidate, Andy Gan (who later went to serve Marine Parade GRC in 2001), who lost Potong Pasir from Chiam in the 1997 elections, even with the support the party gave him.

In the 2006 elections, the People's Action Party promised extensive upgrading for Potong Pasir estate if Sitoh Yih Pin got elected as MP for the seat of Potong Pasir. Despite that, Chiam won for the sixth consecutive term, by a larger margin compared to 2001.

In the 2011 elections, Lina Chiam, who took over the reins from incumbent Chiam See Tong (who contested and later defeated in Bishan-Toa Payoh GRC), lost to twice-unsuccessful challenger Sitoh Yih Pin of the People's Action Party by a mere 114 votes in a close 7973–7859 vote count. Chiam was however eligible for a seat in a non-constituency Member of Parliament, by virtue she was the best performer among the losing candidates in this election; becoming the sole non-Workers' Party opposition member representing in the Parliament following the election.

In the 2015 General Elections, Sitoh Yih Pin successfully defended this ward to Lina Chiam, this time with 66.41% of the votes. Chiam was not given an NCMP and thus ending a 31-year streak where SPP represented an opposition ward since 1984.

In the 2020 elections, Sitoh again re-elected for a third term defeating new candidate Jose Raymond in a 60.7%-39.3% vote.

Schools

Potong Pasir estate is home to St Andrew's Village, a mega cluster of schools part of The Saints Family. It comprises St Andrew's Junior School, St Andrew's Junior College; together forming St. Andrew's School. The name of the school is usually abbreviated as SA or SAS. Its students and alumni ('Old Boys' and 'Old Girls') are referred to as Saints.

In the 2000s, as part of the St Andrew's Village project, all three schools were planned to reunite in Potong Pasir. Renovation and expansion of the Junior School started in 2003, and the new buildings opened in December 2004. Construction of a new Secondary School started in 2003, opposite the Junior School along Francis Thomas Drive, and opened in December 2004. Construction of the Junior College started in June 2003 after the Secondary School vacated the site and shifted to its holding location. The Junior College opened in December 2005 and a ceremony was held to mark its return to Potong Pasir. The Village was officially opened on 26 August 2006, with the ceremony being held at the 1000-seater Cultural Centre in the Junior College.

External links

Jalan Besar Town Council

Serangoon
Places in Singapore
Housing estates in Singapore